Christians for Community (Cristiano por la Comunidad) is a Christian democratic political party in Colombia. 
At the last legislative elections, 10 March 2002, the party won, as one of the many small parties, parliamentary representation. 

Christian political parties
Conservative parties in Colombia
Christian democratic parties in South America

Christian democratic parties in Colombia